While I Was Gone is a 1999 novel by Sue Miller, and was chosen as an Oprah's Book Club selection in May 2000. 

CBS produced a TV movie, While I Was Gone in 2004 based on the novel.

1999 American novels
American novels adapted into films
American novels adapted into television shows